In desert warfare, the heat and lack of water can sometimes be more dangerous than the enemy. The desert terrain is the second-most inhospitable to troops after a cold environment. The lack of water, extremes of heat/cold, and the lack of cover make it difficult for troops to survive.

Properties and tactics
The barrenness of the desert makes the capture of key cities essential to ensure the ability to maintain control over important resources, primarily clean water, and being able to keep a military well supplied. As such, that makes sieges in conventional warfare more frequent, as the defender often prepares entrenched positions to protect the cities that supply them.

Camouflage and cover

Many deserts have limited numbers of noticeable landmarks, which can make maneuvering through a desert a logistical nightmare.

Mobility
Mobility is essential to a successful desert war, which explains the heavy use of armour in battles such as in El Alamein during the Second World War. It has been noted that mobility is so important in desert warfare that battles can sometimes begin to resemble naval engagements since the actual possession of territory is less important than the positions of one's tanks (or ships).

Unlike other types of terrain, which depend on roads, movement in deserts is often possible in all directions because of the wide open spaces. However, the resource-scarce desert environment means that availability of supplies can greatly constrict movement. Militaries often make use of cavalry to cross the large expanses of a harsh desert without increasing the exertion of the soldiers, who are already at a higher risk of dehydration because of the high temperatures during the day.

There are many enemies to the desert fighter. They include aircraft, and tanks, which can be extremely menacing to desert guerrillas because there is little way to equal such force. Additionally, there are few places to hide from such weapons in the desert environment since there are few obstructions.

Another problem is the sand dunes, mobility is reduced by 60%. With no firm and stable ground footing, it is easy to slide down or even get buried.

Water scarcity
Lack of water and extreme heat can also cause complications in engaging in desert warfare. Military personnel consume much higher quantities of water in the desert from perspiration and so troop movements are often limited by water carrying capacity. The scarcity of water may lead to bases moving from one position to another to look for a water source.

Harassing supply lines 
In the context of guerilla warfare, the wide expanses of deserts can make it more difficilt for large forces to defend their supply lines. Guerilla forces can use ambushes to their advantage and make their adversary deploy forces to protect railways or other infrastructure at great cost. That tactic was successfully used by T.E. Lawrence during the Arab Revolt against the Ottoman Empire.

Health effects

Body temperature
In desert warfare, an individual's body temperature can reach unusual highs causing fever-like weakness and dehydration.

Dehydration
An individual may have to face conditions of dehydration in desert warfare because of the lack of edible fluids and clean water.

Fatigue
Fatigue and bodily stress caused by the heat can cause very serious discomfort.

Glare 
Sunlight can irritate eyesight or reduce visibility.

Examples

Battles

 Battle of Gazala (1942)
 First Battle of El Alamein (1942)
 Second Battle of El Alamein (1942)
 Battle of Asal Uttar (1965)
 Battle of Longewala (1971)

Wars
 French campaign in Egypt and Syria (1798–1801)
 Crimean War (1853–1856)
 War of the Pacific in the Atacama Desert (1879–1884)
 Middle Eastern theatre of World War I (1914–1918)
 Middle Eastern and North African theatres of World War II (1939–1945)
 Sand War (1963)
 Indo-Pakistani War of 1965
 Six-Day War (1967)
 Indo-Pakistani War of 1971
 Yom Kippur War (1973)
 Western Sahara War (1973–1991)
 Iran–Iraq War (1980–1988)
 Gulf War (1990–1991)
 Iraq War (2003–2011)
 2011 Libyan civil war (2011)
 War in Iraq (2013-2017)

Current conflicts
 Somali Civil War (1991–present)
 Syrian Civil War (2011–present)
 Mali War (2012–present)

References

Further reading 
 Information site on Desert warfare, Iraq war
 Desert warfare: German experiences in WWII - Combined arms Research library

Land warfare
Desert warfare